6th Rifle Division can refer to:

 6th Guards Rifle Division (Soviet Union)
 6th Rifle Division (Soviet Union)
 6th Rifle Division (Ukraine)
 6th Siberian Rifle Division